Augustus De Morgan (27 June 1806 – 18 March 1871) was a British mathematician and logician. He formulated De Morgan's laws and introduced the term mathematical induction, making its idea rigorous.

Biography

Childhood

Augustus De Morgan was born in Madurai, in the Carnatic region of India in 1806. His father was Lieut.-Colonel John De Morgan (1772–1816), who held various appointments in the service of the East India Company, and his mother, Elizabeth (née Dodson, 1776–1856), was daughter of John Dodson and granddaughter of James Dodson, who computed a table of anti-logarithms (inverse logarithms). Augustus De Morgan became blind in one eye a month or two after he was born. The family moved to England when Augustus was seven months old. As his father and grandfather had both been born in India, De Morgan used to say that he was neither English, nor Scottish, nor Irish, but a Briton "unattached", using the technical term applied to an undergraduate of Oxford or Cambridge who is not a member of any one of the Colleges.

When De Morgan was ten years old his father died. Mrs De Morgan resided at various places in the southwest of England, and her son received his primary education at various schools of no great account. His mathematical talents went unnoticed until he was fourteen, when a family-friend discovered him making an elaborate drawing of a figure from one of Euclid's works with a ruler and compasses. 

He received his secondary education from Mr Parsons, a fellow of Oriel College, Oxford, who appreciated classics better than mathematics. His mother was an active and ardent member of the Church of England, and desired that her son should become a clergyman, but by this time De Morgan had begun to show his non-conforming disposition. He became an atheist.

University education
In 1823, at the age of sixteen, he entered Trinity College, Cambridge, where he came under the influence of George Peacock and William Whewell, who became his lifelong friends; from the former he derived an interest in the renovation of algebra, and from the latter an interest in the renovation of logic—the two subjects of his future life work. His college tutor was John Philips Higman, FRS (1793–1855).

At college he played the flute for recreation and was prominent in the musical clubs. His love of knowledge for its own sake interfered with training for the great mathematical race; as a consequence he came out fourth wrangler. This entitled him to the degree of Bachelor of Arts; but to take the higher degree of Master of Arts and thereby become eligible for a fellowship it was then necessary to pass a theological test. To the signing of any such test De Morgan felt a strong objection, although he had been brought up in the Church of England. In about 1875 theological tests for academic degrees were abolished in the Universities of Oxford and Cambridge.

London University
As no career was open to him at his own university, he decided to go to the Bar, and took up residence in London; but he much preferred teaching mathematics to reading law. About this time the movement for founding London University (now University College London) took shape. The two ancient universities of Oxford and Cambridge were so guarded by theological tests that no Jew or Dissenter outside the Church of England could enter as a student, still less be appointed to any office. A body of liberal-minded men resolved to meet the difficulty by establishing in London a university on the principle of religious neutrality. De Morgan, then 22 years of age, was appointed professor of mathematics. His introductory lecture "On the study of mathematics" is a discourse upon mental education of permanent value, and has been recently reprinted in the United States.

The London University was a new institution, and the relations of the Council of management, the Senate of professors and the body of students were not well defined. A dispute arose between the professor of anatomy and his students, and in consequence of the action taken by the council, several professors resigned, headed by De Morgan. Another professor of mathematics was appointed, who then drowned a few years later. De Morgan had shown himself a prince of teachers: he was invited to return to his chair, which thereafter became the continuous centre of his labours for thirty years.

The same body of reformers—headed by Lord Brougham, a Scotsman eminent both in science and politics who had instituted the London University—founded about the same time a Society for the Diffusion of Useful Knowledge. Its object was to spread scientific and other knowledge by means of cheap and clearly written treatises by the best writers of the time. One of its most voluminous and effective writers was De Morgan. He wrote a great work on The Differential and Integral Calculus which was published by the Society; and he wrote one-sixth of the articles in the Penny Cyclopedia, published by the Society, and issued in penny numbers. When De Morgan came to reside in London he found a congenial friend in William Frend, notwithstanding his mathematical heresy about negative quantities. Both were arithmeticians and actuaries, and their religious views were somewhat similar. Frend lived in what was then a suburb of London, in a country-house formerly occupied by Daniel Defoe and Isaac Watts. De Morgan with his flute was a welcome visitor.

The London University of which De Morgan was a professor was a different institution from the University of London. The University of London was founded about ten years later by the Government for the purpose of granting degrees after examination, without any qualification as to residence. The London University was affiliated as a teaching college with the University of London, and its name was changed to University College. The University of London was not a success as an examining body; a teaching University was demanded. De Morgan was a highly successful teacher of mathematics. It was his plan to lecture for an hour, and at the close of each lecture to give out a number of problems and examples illustrative of the subject lectured on; his students were required to sit down to them and bring him the results, which he looked over and returned revised before the next lecture. In De Morgan's opinion, a thorough comprehension and mental assimilation of great principles far outweighed in importance any merely analytical dexterity in the application of half-understood principles to particular cases.

During this period, he also promoted the work of the self-taught Indian mathematician Ramchundra, who has been called De Morgan's Ramanujan. He supervised the publication in London of Ramchundra's book Treatise on Problems of Maxima and Minima in 1859. In his preface to that edition, De Morgan wrote:
 
In the same preface, he acknowledged his awareness of the Indian tradition of logic, and later wrote again, in 1860, of its significance: 

Though the sophistication of Indian logical thought had been brought to the attention of Western mathematicians by a number of authors beginning in the late-18th century, it is not known whether this had any influence on De Morgan's own work. Mary Boole, however, claimed a profound influence – via her uncle George Everest – of Indian thought in general and Indian logic, in particular, on George Boole, as well as on De Morgan and Charles Babbage:Think what must have been the effect of the intense Hinduizing of three such men as Babbage, De Morgan, and George Boole on the mathematical atmosphere of 1830–65. What share had it in generating the Vector Analysis and the mathematics by which investigations in physical science are now conducted?

Jonardon Ganeri has observed that it was this period of the mid-nineteenth century pointed to by Mary Boole that saw George Boole (1815–1864) and Augustus De Morgan (1806–1871) make their pioneering applications of algebraic ideas to the formulation of logic (algebraic logic and Boolean logic), and has suggested that these figures were likely to have been aware of the Indian system of logic, and in turn, that their awareness of the shortcomings of propositional logic as it was then formulated may have contributed to their willingness to look beyond their own logical tradition.

Family
Augustus was one of seven children, four of whom survived to adulthood.
 Eliza (1801–1836) married Lewis Hensley, a surgeon, living in Bath.
 Augustus (1806–1871)
 George (1808–1890), a barrister-at-law who married Josephine, daughter of Vice Admiral Josiah Coghill, 3rd Baronet Coghill
 Campbell Greig (1811–1876), a surgeon at the Middlesex Hospital

In the autumn of 1837, he married Sophia Elizabeth Frend (1809–1892), eldest daughter of William Frend (1757–1841) and Sarah Blackburne (1779–?), a granddaughter of Francis Blackburne (1705–1787), Archdeacon of Cleveland.

De Morgan had three sons and four daughters, including fairytale author Mary De Morgan. His eldest son was the potter William De Morgan. His second son George acquired distinction in mathematics at University College and the University of London. He and another like-minded alumnus conceived the idea of founding a mathematical society in London, where mathematical papers would be not only received (as by the Royal Society) but actually read and discussed. The first meeting was held in University College; De Morgan was the first president, his son the first secretary. It was the beginning of the London Mathematical Society.

Retirement and death

In 1866 the chair of mental philosophy in University College fell vacant. James Martineau, a Unitarian clergyman and professor of mental philosophy, was recommended formally by the Senate to the council; but in the Council there were some who objected to a Unitarian clergyman, and others who objected to theistic philosophy. A layman of the school of Bain and Spencer was appointed. De Morgan considered that the old standard of religious neutrality had been hauled down, and forthwith resigned. He was now 60 years of age. His pupils secured him a pension of £500 p.a., but misfortunes followed. Two years later his son George—the "younger Bernoulli", as Augustus loved to hear him called, in allusion to the eminent father-and-son mathematicians of that name—died. This blow was followed by the death of a daughter. Five years after his resignation from University College De Morgan died of nervous prostration on 18 March 1871.

Mathematical work
De Morgan was a brilliant and witty writer, whether as a controversialist or as a correspondent. In his time there flourished two Sir William Hamiltons who have often been conflated. One was Sir William Hamilton, 9th Baronet, a Scotsman, professor of logic and metaphysics at the University of Edinburgh; the other was a knight (that is, won the title), an Irishman, professor at astronomy in the University of Dublin. The baronet contributed to logic, especially the doctrine of the quantification of the predicate; the knight, whose full name was William Rowan Hamilton, contributed to mathematics, especially geometric algebra, and first described the Quaternions. De Morgan was interested in the work of both, and corresponded with both; but the correspondence with the Scotsman ended in a public controversy, whereas that with the Irishman was marked by friendship and terminated only by death. In one of his letters to Rowan, De Morgan says:

The correspondence of De Morgan with Hamilton the mathematician extended over twenty-four years; it contains discussions not only of mathematical matters, but also of subjects of general interest. It is marked by geniality on the part of Hamilton and by wit on the part of De Morgan. The following is a specimen:
Hamilton wrote:

De Morgan replied:

De Morgan was full of personal peculiarities. On the occasion of the installation of his friend, Lord Brougham, as Rector of the University of Edinburgh, the Senate offered to confer on him the honorary degree of LL. D.; he declined the honour as a misnomer. He once printed his name: Augustus De Morgan, H – O – M – O – P – A – U – C – A – R – U – M – L – I – T – E – R – A – R – U – M (Latin for "man of few letters").

He disliked the provinces outside London, and while his family enjoyed the seaside, and men of science were having a good time at a meeting of the British Association in the country, he remained in the hot and dusty libraries of the metropolis. He said that he felt like Socrates, who declared that the farther he was from Athens the farther was he from happiness. He never sought to become a Fellow of the Royal Society, and he never attended a meeting of the Society; he said that he had no ideas or sympathies in common with the physical philosopher. His attitude was possibly due to his physical infirmity, which prevented him from being either an observer or an experimenter. He never voted at an election, and he never visited the House of Commons, the Tower of London or Westminster Abbey.

Were the writings of De Morgan, such as his contributions to the Useful Knowledge Society, published in the form of collected works, they would form a small library. Mainly through the efforts of Peacock and Whewell, a Philosophical Society had been inaugurated at Cambridge, and De Morgan contributed four memoirs to its transactions on the foundations of algebra, and an equal number on formal logic. The best presentation of his view of algebra is found in a volume, entitled Trigonometry and Double Algebra, published in 1849; and his earlier view of formal logic is found in a volume published in 1847. His most distinctive work is styled A Budget of Paradoxes; it originally appeared as letters in the columns of the Athenæum journal; it was revised and extended by De Morgan in the last years of his life, and was published posthumously by his widow.

George Peacock's theory of algebra was much improved by D. F. Gregory, a younger member of the Cambridge School, who laid stress not on the permanence of equivalent forms, but on the permanence of certain formal laws. This new theory of algebra as the science of symbols and of their laws of combination was carried to its logical issue by De Morgan; and his doctrine on the subject is still followed by English algebraists in general. Thus George Chrystal founds his Textbook of Algebra on De Morgan's theory; although an attentive reader may remark that he practically abandons it when he takes up the subject of infinite series. De Morgan's theory is stated in his volume on Trigonometry and Double Algebra, where in Book II, Chapter II, headed "On symbolic algebra", he writes:

It indicates that the two symbols have the same resulting meaning, by whatever different steps attained.

Trigonometry and Double Algebra
De Morgan's work entitled Trigonometry and Double Algebra consists of two parts; the former of which is a treatise on trigonometry, and the latter a treatise on generalized algebra which he called "double algebra". The next stage is universal arithmetic, where letters appear instead of numbers, so as to denote numbers universally, and the processes are conducted without knowing the values of the symbols. Let  and  denote any natural numbers. An expression such as  may still be impossible, so in universal arithmetic there is always a proviso, provided the operation is possible. The third stage is single algebra, where the symbol may denote a quantity forwards or a quantity backwards, and is adequately represented by segments on a straight line passing through an origin. Negative quantities are then no longer impossible; they are represented by the backward segment. The fourth stage is double algebra. The algebraic symbol denotes in general a segment of a line in a given plane. The expression  then represents a line in the plane having an abscissa  and an ordinate . De Morgan attempted it by reducing such an expression to the form , and he considered that he had shown that it could be always so reduced. The remarkable fact is that this double algebra satisfies all the fundamental laws above enumerated, and as every apparently impossible combination of symbols has been interpreted it looks like the complete form of algebra. In chapter 6 he introduced hyperbolic functions and discussed the connection of common and hyperbolic trigonometry.

If the above theory is true, the next stage of development ought to be triple algebra and if  truly represents a line in a given plane, it ought to be possible to find a third term which added to the above would represent a line in space. Argand and some others guessed that it was  although this contradicts the truth established by Euler that . De Morgan and many others worked hard at the problem, but nothing came of it until the problem was taken up by Hamilton. We now see the reason clearly: The symbol of double algebra denotes not a length and a direction; but a multiplier and an angle. In it the angles are confined to one plane. Hence the next stage will be a quadruple algebra, when the axis of the plane is made variable. And this gives the answer to the first question; double algebra is nothing but analytical plane trigonometry, and this is why it has been found to be the natural analysis for alternating currents. But De Morgan never got this far. He died with the belief that "double algebra must remain as the full development of the conceptions of arithmetic, so far as those symbols are concerned which arithmetic immediately suggests".

In Book II, Chapter II, following the above quoted passage about the theory of symbolic algebra, De Morgan proceeds to give an inventory of the fundamental symbols of algebra, and also an inventory of the laws of algebra. As De Morgan explains, the last of these symbols represents writing a latter expression in superscript over and after a former. His inventory of the fundamental laws is expressed under fourteen heads, but some of them are merely definitions. The preceding list of symbols is the matter under the first of these heads.

Identity laws.          
Law of signs.         
Commutative law.   
Distributive law.     
Index laws.      

De Morgan professes to give a complete inventory of the laws which the symbols of algebra must obey, for he says, "Any system of symbols which obeys these rules and no others—except they be formed by combination of these rules—and which uses the preceding symbols and no others—except they be new symbols invented in abbreviation of combinations of these symbols—is symbolic algebra." From his point of view, none of the above principles are rules; they are formal laws, that is, arbitrarily chosen relations to which the algebraic symbols must be subject. He does not mention the law, which had already been pointed out by Gregory, namely,  and to which was afterwards given the name Law of association. If the commutative law fails, the associative may hold good; but not vice versa. Why does he not give it full scope? Because the foundations of algebra are, after all, real not formal, material not symbolic. To the formalists the index operations are exceedingly refractory, in consequence of which some take no account of them, but relegate them to applied mathematics. To give an inventory of the laws which the symbols of algebra must obey is an impossible task, and reminds one not a little of the task of those philosophers who attempt to give an inventory of the a priori knowledge of the mind.

Formal Logic

When the study of mathematics revived at the University of Cambridge, so did the study of logic. The moving spirit was Whewell, the Master of Trinity College, whose principal writings were a History of the Inductive Sciences, and Philosophy of the Inductive Sciences. Doubtless De Morgan was influenced in his logical investigations by Whewell; but other influential contemporaries were Sir William Rowan Hamilton at Dublin, and George Boole at Cork. De Morgan's work, Formal Logic, published in 1847, is principally remarkable for his development of the numerically definite syllogism. The followers of Aristotle say that from two particular propositions such as Some M's are A's, and Some M's are B's nothing follows of necessity about the relation of the A's and B's. But they go further and say in order that any relation about the A's and B's may follow of necessity, the middle term must be taken universally in one of the premises. De Morgan pointed out that from Most M's are A's and Most M's are B's it follows of necessity that some A's are B's and he formulated the numerically definite syllogism which puts this principle in exact quantitative form. Suppose that the number of souls on board a steamer was 1000, that 500 were in the saloon, and 700 were lost. It follows of necessity, that at least 700 + 500 – 1000, that is, 200, saloon passengers were lost. This single principle suffices to prove the validity of all the Aristotelian moods. It is therefore a fundamental principle in necessary reasoning.

Here then De Morgan had made a great advance by introducing quantification of the terms. At that time Sir William Hamilton was teaching in Edinburgh a doctrine of the quantification of the predicate, and a correspondence sprang up. However, De Morgan soon perceived that Hamilton's quantification was of a different character; that it meant for example, substituting the two forms The whole of A is the whole of B, and The whole of A is a part of B for the Aristotelian form All A's are B's. Hamilton thought that he had placed the keystone in the Aristotelian arch, as he phrased it. Although it must have been a curious arch which could stand 2000 years without a keystone. As a consequence he had no room for De Morgan's innovations. He accused De Morgan of plagiarism, and the controversy raged for years in the columns of the Athenæum, and in the publications of the two writers.

The memoirs on logic which De Morgan contributed to the Transactions of the Cambridge Philosophical Society subsequent to the publication of his book Formal Logic are by far the most important contributions which he made to the science, especially his fourth memoir, in which he begins work in the broad field of the "logic of relatives".

Budget of Paradoxes
In the introduction to the Budget of Paradoxes De Morgan explains what he means by the word:

How can the sound paradoxer be distinguished from the false paradoxer? De Morgan supplies the following test:

The Budget consists of a review of a large collection of paradoxical books which De Morgan had accumulated in his own library, partly by purchase at bookstands, partly from books sent to him for review, partly from books sent to him by the authors. He gives the following classification: squarers of the circle, trisectors of the angle, duplicators of the cube, constructors of perpetual motion, subverters of gravitation, stagnators of the earth, builders of the universe. You will still find specimens of all these classes in the New World and in the new century. De Morgan gives his personal knowledge of paradoxers.

A paradoxer to whom De Morgan paid the compliment which Achilles paid Hector – to drag him round the walls again and again – was James Smith, a successful merchant of Liverpool. He found . His mode of reasoning was a curious caricature of the reductio ad absurdum of Euclid. He said let , and then showed that on that supposition, every other value of  must be absurd. Consequently,  is the true value. The following is a specimen of De Morgan's dragging round the walls of Troy:

In the region of pure mathematics, De Morgan could detect easily the false from the true paradox; but he was not so proficient in the field of physics. His father-in-law was a paradoxer, and his wife a paradoxer; and in the opinion of the physical philosophers De Morgan himself scarcely escaped. His wife wrote a book describing the phenomena of spiritualism, table-rapping, table-turning, etc.; and De Morgan wrote a preface in which he said that he knew some of the asserted facts, believed others on testimony, but did not pretend to know whether they were caused by spirits, or had some unknown and unimagined origin. From this alternative he left out ordinary material causes. Faraday delivered a lecture on Spiritualism, in which he laid it down that in the investigation we ought to set out with the idea of what is physically possible, or impossible; De Morgan did not believe this.

Relations
De Morgan developed the calculus of relations in his Syllabus of a Proposed System of Logic (1966: 208–46), first published in 1860. De Morgan was able to show that reasoning with syllogisms could be replaced with composition of relations. The calculus was described as the logic of relatives by Charles Sanders Peirce, who admired De Morgan and met him shortly before his death. The calculus was further extended in the third volume of Ernst Schröder's Vorlesungen über die Algebra der Logik. Binary relations, especially order theory, proved critical to the Principia Mathematica of Bertrand Russell and Alfred North Whitehead. In turn, this calculus became the subject of much further work, starting in 1940, by Alfred Tarski and his colleagues and students at the University of California.

Spiritualism
De Morgan later in his life became interested in the phenomena of spiritualism. In 1849, he had investigated clairvoyance and was impressed by the subject. He later carried out paranormal investigations in his own home with the American medium Maria Hayden. The result of those investigations was later published by his wife Sophia. De Morgan believed that his career as a scientist might have been affected if he had revealed his interest in the study of spiritualism, so he helped to publish the book anonymously. The book was published in 1863, titled From Matter to Spirit: The Result of Ten Years Experience in Spirit Manifestations.

According to historian Janet Oppenheim, De Morgan's wife Sophia was a convinced spiritualist but De Morgan shared a third way position on spiritualist phenomena, which Oppenheim defined as a "wait-and-see position"; he was neither a believer nor a sceptic. Instead, his viewpoint was that the methodology of the physical sciences does not automatically exclude psychic phenomena, and that such phenomena may be explainable in time by the possible existence of natural forces which physicists had not yet identified.

In the preface of From Matter to Spirit (1863), De Morgan stated:

Psychical researcher John Beloff wrote that De Morgan was the first notable scientist in Britain to take an interest in the study of spiritualism and his studies had influenced the decision of William Crookes to also study spiritualism. Beloff also claims that De Morgan was an atheist and so he was debarred from a position at Oxford or Cambridge.

Legacy
Beyond his great mathematical legacy, the headquarters of the London Mathematical Society is called De Morgan House and the student society of the Mathematics Department of University College London is called the Augustus De Morgan Society.

The crater De Morgan on the Moon is named after him.

Selected writings

See also
 History of Grandi's series
 Murphy's law
 Squaring the circle

References

Notes

Citations

Sources

Further reading

 De Morgan, A., 1966. Logic: On the Syllogism and Other Logical Writings. Heath, P., ed. Routledge. A useful collection of De Morgan's most important writings on logic.

External links

 
 
 
 
Papers of Augustus De Morgan held by Senate House Library, University of London
Library of Augustus De Morgan
 
 

1806 births
1871 deaths
19th-century British philosophers
19th-century English mathematicians
19th-century English writers
Academics of University College London
Alumni of Trinity College, Cambridge
English logicians
English philosophers
Parapsychologists
Presidents of the London Mathematical Society
Quantitative linguistics
Scientists from Madurai
Victorian writers